Francisco Julia (born 4 May 1942) is a Spanish racing cyclist. He rode in the 1971 Tour de France.

References

External links
 

1942 births
Living people
Spanish male cyclists
Place of birth missing (living people)
People from Felanitx
Sportspeople from Mallorca
Cyclists from the Balearic Islands
20th-century Spanish people